

Events

January

 January 1 – The Federation of Rhodesia and Nyasaland is dissolved.
 January 5 - In the first meeting between leaders of the Roman Catholic and Orthodox churches since the fifteenth century, Pope Paul VI and Patriarch Athenagoras I of Constantinople meet in Jerusalem.
 January 6 – A British firm, the Leyland Motor Corp., announces the sale of 450 buses to the Cuban government, challenging the United States blockade of Cuba.
 January 9 – Martyrs' Day: Armed clashes between United States troops and Panamanian civilians in the Panama Canal Zone precipitate a major international crisis, resulting in the deaths of 21 Panamanians and 4 U.S. soldiers.
 January 11 – United States Surgeon General Luther Terry reports that smoking may be hazardous to one's health (the first such statement from the U.S. government).
 January 12
 Zanzibar Revolution: The predominantly Arab government of Zanzibar is overthrown by African nationalist rebels; a United States Navy destroyer evacuates 61 U.S. citizens.
 Routine U.S. naval patrols of the South China Sea begin.
 January 20 – Meet the Beatles!, the first Beatles album from Capitol Records in the United States, is released ten days after Chicago's Vee-Jay Records releases Introducing... The Beatles. The two record companies battle it out in court for months, eventually coming to a conclusion.
 January 22 – Kenneth Kaunda is inaugurated as the first Prime Minister of Northern Rhodesia.
 January 23 – Thirteen years after its proposal and nearly two years after its passage by the United States Senate, the 24th Amendment to the United States Constitution, prohibiting the use of poll taxes in national elections, is ratified.
 January 27
 France and the People's Republic of China announce their decision to establish diplomatic relations.
 U.S. Senator Margaret Chase Smith, 66, announces her candidacy for the Republican presidential nomination.
 January 28 – A U.S. Air Force jet training aircraft that strays into East Germany is shot down by Soviet fighters near Erfurt; all three crewmen are killed.
 January 29 – February 9 – The 1964 Winter Olympics are held in Innsbruck, Austria.
 January 29
 The Soviet Union launches two scientific satellites, Elektron I and II, from a single rocket.
 Ranger 6 is launched by NASA, on a mission to carry television cameras and crash-land on the Moon.
 January 30 – General Nguyễn Khánh leads a bloodless military coup d'état, replacing Dương Văn Minh as Prime Minister of South Vietnam.

February

 February 4 – The Government of the United States authorizes the Twenty-fourth Amendment to the United States Constitution, outlawing the poll tax.
 February 5 – India backs out of its promise to hold a plebiscite in the disputed territory of Kashmir. In 1948, India had taken the issue of Kashmir to the United Nations Security Council and offered to hold a plebiscite in the held Kashmir under UN supervision.
 February 6 – Cuba cuts off the normal water supply to the United States Guantanamo Bay Naval Base, in reprisal for the U.S. seizure four days earlier of four Cuban fishing boats off the coast of Florida.
 February 10 – Melbourne–Voyager collision: 82 Australian sailors die when a Royal Australian Navy aircraft carrier and a destroyer collide off New South Wales, Australia.
 February 11
 Greeks and Turks begin fighting in Limassol, Cyprus.
 The Republic of China severs diplomatic relations with France because of French recognition of the People's Republic of China.
 February 17 – Gabonese president Léon M'ba is toppled by a military coup and his arch-rival, Jean-Hilaire Aubame, is installed in his place. However, French intervention restores M'ba's government the next day.
 February 25 – Cassius Clay (later Muhammad Ali) beats Sonny Liston in Miami Beach, Florida, and is crowned the heavyweight champion of the world.
 February 26 – U.S. politician John Glenn withdraws from the race for the Democratic Party Senate nomination, following a domestic accident.
 February 27 – The Italian government asks for help to keep the Leaning Tower of Pisa from toppling over.

March

 March 6
 Constantine II becomes King of Greece, upon the death of his father King Paul.
 Boxer Cassius Clay announces the change of his name to Muhammad Ali.
 March 9
 New York Times Co. v Sullivan (376 US 254 1964): The United States Supreme Court rules that under the First Amendment, speech criticizing political figures cannot be censored.
 The London Fisheries Convention is signed, giving signatories the right of full access to fishing grounds within 12 nautical miles of the western European coastline.
 March 10
 Soviet military forces shoot down an unarmed reconnaissance bomber that had strayed into East Germany; the 3 U.S. flyers parachute to safety.
 Henry Cabot Lodge Jr., United States Ambassador to South Vietnam, wins the New Hampshire Republican primary.
 March 12 – Malcolm X leaves the Nation of Islam.
 March 14 – A Dallas, Texas, jury finds Jack Ruby guilty of killing John F. Kennedy assassin Lee Harvey Oswald.
 March 15 – Richard Burton and Elizabeth Taylor marry (for the first time) in Montreal.
 March 18 – 1964 Moscow protest: Approximately 50 Moroccan students break into the embassy of Morocco in the Soviet Union and stage an all‐day sit-in protesting against sentencing of eleven people to death for the alleged assassination attempt of King Hassan II of Morocco.
 March 19 – The American Jerrie Mock sets out to become the first woman to fly solo around the world from March 19, completing her flight on April 17.
 March 20 – June 6 – The first United Nations Conference on Trade and Development takes place.
 March 20 – The precursor of the European Space Agency, ESRO (European Space Research Organization) is established per an agreement signed on June 14, 1962.
 March 21 – Non ho l'età by Gigliola Cinquetti (music by Nicola Salerno, text by Mario Panzeri) wins the Eurovision Song Contest 1964 for Italy.
 March 27 (Good Friday) – The Great Alaskan earthquake, the second-most powerful known (and the most powerful earthquake recorded in North American history) at a magnitude of 9.2, strikes Southcentral Alaska, killing 125 people and inflicting massive damage to the city of Anchorage.
 March 28
 King Saud of Saudi Arabia abdicates the throne. His brother, Prince Faisal, does not officially assume the throne until November.
 Radio Caroline becomes the United Kingdom's first "Pirate" radio station, broadcasting from a ship anchored just outside UK territorial waters on the east coast.
 March 31 – The military overthrows Brazilian President João Goulart in a coup, starting 21 years of dictatorship in Brazil. It ends in 1985.

April

 April 1 – Deployed military rule in Brazil ends the government of democratically elected president, João Goulart.
 April 4
 The Beatles hold the top 5 positions in the Billboard Top 40 singles in America, an unprecedented achievement. The top songs in America as listed on April 4, in order, are: "Can't Buy Me Love", "Twist and Shout", "She Loves You", "I Want to Hold Your Hand", and "Please Please Me".

 April 7 – IBM announces the System/360.
 April 8 – Gemini 1 is launched, the first unmanned test of the 2-man spacecraft.
 April 9 – The United Nations Security Council adopts by a 9–0 vote a resolution deploring a British air attack on a fort in Yemen 12 days earlier, in which 25 persons have been reported killed.
 April 11 – The Brazilian Congress elects Field Marshal Humberto de Alencar Castelo Branco as President of Brazil.
 April 13
 At the 36th Academy Awards ceremony, Sidney Poitier becomes the first African-American to win an Academy Award in the category Best Actor in a Leading Role in Lilies of the Field.
 April 16 – In the Assize Court at Buckingham, UK, sentences totalling 307 years are passed on twelve men who stole £2,600,000 in used bank notes, after holding up the night train from Glasgow to London in August 1963 – a heist that becomes known as the Great Train Robbery.
 April 19 – In Laos, the coalition government of Prince Souvanna Phouma is deposed by a right-wing military group, led by Brig. Gen. Kouprasith Abhay. Not supported by the United States, the coup is ultimately unsuccessful, and Souvanna Phouma is reinstated, remaining as Prime Minister until 1975.
 April 20
 U.S. President Lyndon Johnson in New York, and Soviet Premier Nikita Khrushchev in Moscow, simultaneously announce plans to cut back production of materials for making nuclear weapons.
 Nelson Mandela makes his "I Am Prepared to Die" speech at the opening of the Rivonia Trial, a key event for the anti-apartheid movement.
 In the UK, BBC Two television starts broadcasting for the first time.
 April 22
 British businessman Greville Wynne, imprisoned in Moscow since 1963 for spying, is exchanged for Soviet spy Gordon Lonsdale.
 The 1964 New York World's Fair opens to celebrate the 300th anniversary of New Amsterdam being taken over by British forces under the Duke of York (later King James II) and being renamed New York in 1664. The fair runs until October 18, 1964, and reopens April 21, 1965, finally closing October 17, 1965. Although not internationally sanctioned, due to being within ten years of the Seattle World's Fair in 1962, so that some countries decline to attend, many have pavilions with exotic crafts, art and food.
 April 25 – Thieves steal the head of the Little Mermaid statue in Copenhagen, Denmark (Although the attack was attributed to Jørgen Nash, the Danish media blamed the painter Henrik Bruun, who never confessed to the crime).
 April 26 – Tanganyika and Zanzibar merge to form Tanzania.

May

 May 1 – At 4:00 a.m., John George Kemeny and Thomas Eugene Kurtz run the first computer program written in BASIC (Beginners' All-purpose Symbolic Instruction Code), an easy to learn high level programming language which they have created. BASIC is eventually included on many computers and even some games consoles.
 May 2
 Vietnam War: Attack on USNS Card – An explosion caused by Viet Cong commandos causes carrier USNS Card to sink in the port of Saigon. 
 Some 400–1,000 students march through Times Square, New York, and another 700 in San Francisco, in the first major student demonstration against the Vietnam War. Smaller marches also occur in Boston, Seattle, and Madison, WI.
 United States Senator Barry Goldwater receives more than 75% of the votes in the Texas Republican presidential primary.
 Henry Hezekiah Dee and Charles Eddie Moore, hitchhiking in Meadville, Mississippi, are kidnapped, beaten and murdered by members of the Ku Klux Klan. Their badly decomposed bodies are found by chance in July during the search for missing activists Chaney, Goodman, and Schwerner.
 May 4 – The United States Congress recognizes Bourbon whiskey as a "distinctive product of the United States".
 May 7
 Pacific Air Lines Flight 773 crashes near San Ramon, California, killing all 44 aboard; the FBI later reports that a cockpit recorder tape indicates that the pilot and co-pilot had been shot by a suicidal passenger.
 At a mail rockets demonstration by Gerhard Zucker on Hasselkopf Mountain near Braunlage (Lower Saxonia, Germany), three people are killed by a rocket explosion.
 May 9 – South Korean President Park Chung-hee reshuffles his Cabinet, after a series of student demonstrations against his efforts to restore diplomatic and trade relations with Japan.
 May 11 – Terence Conran opens the first Habitat store on London's Fulham Road.
 May 12 – Twelve young men in New York City publicly burn their draft cards to protest the Vietnam War; the first such act of war resistance.
 May 23 – Madeline Dassault, 63, wife of a French plane manufacturer and politician, is kidnapped while leaving her car in front of her Paris home; she is found unharmed the next day in a farmhouse  from Paris.
 May 24 – 25 – The crowd at a football match in Lima, Peru riots over a referee's decision in the Peru-Argentina game; 319 are killed, 500 injured.
 May 27 – The ongoing Colombian conflict starts.
 May 28 – The Charter of the Palestine Liberation Organization (PLO) is released by the Arab League.
 May 29 – Having deposed them in a January coup, South Vietnamese leader Nguyen Khanh had rival Generals Tran Van Don and Le Van Kim convicted of "lax morality".

June

 June 2
 Senator Barry Goldwater wins the California Republican primary, making him the overwhelming favorite for the party's nomination as President of the United States.
 Five million shares of stock in the Communications Satellite Corporation (Comsat) are offered for sale at $20 a share, and the issue is quickly sold out.
 June 3 – South Korean President Park Chung-hee declares martial law in Seoul, after 10,000 student demonstrators overpower police.
 June 11
 Greece rejects direct talks with Turkey over Cyprus.
 Cologne school massacre: In Cologne, West Germany, Walter Seifert attacks students and teachers in an elementary school with a flamethrower, killing 10 and injuring 21.
 June 12 – Nelson Mandela and 7 others are sentenced to life imprisonment in South Africa, and sent to the Robben Island prison.
 June 14 - Kicking off the Civil Rights project known as Freedom Summer, 300 volunteers begin preparing for a summer in Mississippi.  The training is held at the Western College for Women (now Miami University).
 June 19 – U.S. Senator Edward Kennedy, 32, is seriously injured in a private plane crash at Southampton, Massachusetts; the pilot is killed.
 June 20 – The Ford GT40 makes its first appearance at the 24 Hours of Le Mans. It does not see its first victory, however, until 2 years later in 1966. At the same event, the AC Cobra wins its class in its second Le Mans appearance.
 June 21 – Spain beats the Soviet Union 2–1 to win the 1964 European Nations Cup.
 June 26 – Moise Tshombe returns to the Democratic Republic of the Congo from exile in Spain.

July

 July 6 – Malawi receives its independence from the United Kingdom.
 July 18
 Six days of race riots begin in Harlem, New York, United States, apparently prompted by the shooting of a teenager.
 Judith Graham Pool publishes her discovery of cryoprecipitate, a frozen blood clotting product made from plasma primarily to treat hemophiliacs around the world.
 July 19 – Vietnam War: At a rally in Saigon, South Vietnamese Prime Minister and military leader Nguyễn Khánh calls for expanding the war into North Vietnam.
 July 20
 Vietnam War: Viet Cong forces attack a provincial capital, killing 11 South Vietnamese military personnel and 40 civilians (30 of which are children).
 The National Movement of the Revolution is established in the Republic of the Congo, becoming the country's sole legal political party.
 July 21 – Race riots begin in Singapore between ethnic Chinese and Malays.
 July 22 – The second meeting of the Organisation of African Unity is held.
 July 24 – A minor criticality accident takes place at a United Nuclear Corporation Fuels recovery plant in Wood River Junction, Rhode Island, United States, causing the death of one worker.
 July 27 – Vietnam War: The U.S. sends 5,000 more military advisers to South Vietnam, bringing the total number of United States forces in Vietnam to 21,000.
 July 31 – Ranger program: Ranger 7 sends back the first close-up photographs of the Moon (images are 1,000 times clearer than anything ever seen from Earth-bound telescopes).

August

 August 2 – Vietnam War: United States destroyer Maddox is attacked in the Gulf of Tonkin. Air support from the carrier USS Ticonderoga sinks one gunboat, while the other two leave the battle.
 August 5
 Vietnam War: Operation Pierce Arrow – Aircraft from carriers USS Ticonderoga and USS Constellation bomb North Vietnam in retaliation for strikes against U.S. destroyers in the Gulf of Tonkin.
 The Simba rebel army in the Democratic Republic of the Congo captures Stanleyville, and takes 1,000 Western hostages.
 August 7 – Vietnam War: The United States Congress passes the Gulf of Tonkin Resolution, giving U.S. President Lyndon B. Johnson broad war powers to deal with North Vietnamese attacks on U.S. forces.
 August 8 – A Rolling Stones gig in Scheveningen gets out of control. Riot police end the gig after about fifteen minutes, upon which spectators start to fight the riot police.
 August 13 – The last judicial hanging in the United Kingdom takes place when murderers Gwynne Owen Evans and Peter Anthony Allen are executed at Walton Prison in Liverpool.
 August 16 – Vietnam War: In a coup, General Nguyễn Khánh replaces Dương Văn Minh as South Vietnam's chief of state and establishes a new constitution, drafted partly by the U.S. Embassy.
 August 18 – The International Olympic Committee bans South Africa from the Tokyo Olympics on the grounds that its teams are racially segregated.
 August 20 – The International Telecommunications Satellite Consortium (Intelsat) began to work.
 August 22 – Goalkeeper Derek Foster of Sunderland becomes the youngest-ever player to play in the English Football League, aged 15 years and 185 days.
 August 24 – 27 – The Democratic National Convention in Atlantic City nominates incumbent President Lyndon B. Johnson for a full term, and U.S. Senator Hubert Humphrey of Minnesota as his running mate.
 August 27 – Walt Disney's Mary Poppins has its world premiere in Los Angeles. It will go on to become Disney's biggest moneymaker, and winner of 5 Academy Awards, including a Best Actress. It is the first Disney film to be nominated for Best Picture.
 August 28 – 30 – Philadelphia 1964 race riot: Tensions between African American residents and police lead to 341 injuries and 774 arrests.

September

 September 2 – Indian Hungry generation poets, including Malay Roy Choudhury, are arrested on charges of conspiracy against the state and obscenity in literature.
 September 4 – The Forth Road Bridge opens over the Firth of Forth in Scotland.
 September 10 – The African Development Bank (AfDB) is founded.
 September 11 – In Jacksonville, Florida, during a tour of the United States, John Lennon announces that the Beatles will not play to a segregated audience.
 September 14
 The third period of the Second Vatican Council opens.
 The London Daily Herald ceases publication, replaced by The Sun.
 September 18 – In Athens, King Constantine II of Greece marries Princess Anne-Marie of Denmark, who becomes Europe's youngest Queen at age 18 years, 19 days.
 September 21 – The island of Malta obtains independence from the United Kingdom.
 September 24 – The Warren Commission, the first official investigation of the assassination of United States President John F. Kennedy, submits its written report.
 September 25 – The Mozambican War of Independence is launched by FRELIMO.

October 

 October – Dr. Robert Moog demonstrates the prototype Moog synthesizer.
 October 1
 Three thousand student activists at the University of California, Berkeley, surround and block a police car from taking a CORE volunteer arrested for not showing his ID, when he violated a ban on outdoor activist card tables. This protest eventually explodes into the Berkeley Free Speech Movement.
 The Shinkansen high-speed rail system, the world's first such system, is inaugurated in Japan, for the first sector between Tokyo and Osaka.
 October 5
 Twenty-three men and thirty-one women escape to West Berlin through a narrow tunnel under the Berlin Wall.
 Elizabeth II and The Duke of Edinburgh begin an 8-day visit to Canada.
 October 10 – 24 – The 1964 Summer Olympics are held in Tokyo, Japan, the first in an Asian country.
 October 12 – The Soviet Union launches Voskhod 1 into Earth orbit as the first spacecraft with a multi-person crew and the first flight without space suits. The flight is cut short and lands again on October 13 after 16 orbits.
 October 14 – American civil rights movement leader Martin Luther King Jr. becomes the youngest recipient of the Nobel Peace Prize, which is awarded to him for leading non-violent resistance to end racial prejudice in the United States.
 October 14 – 15 – Nikita Khrushchev is deposed as leader of the Soviet Union; Leonid Brezhnev and Alexei Kosygin assume power.
 October 15
 The Labour Party wins the parliamentary elections in the United Kingdom, ending 13 years of Conservative Party rule. The new prime minister is Harold Wilson.
 October 16
 Harold Wilson becomes British Prime Minister after leading the Labour Party to a narrow election win over the Conservative government of Sir Alec Douglas-Home, which has been in power for 13 years and had four different leaders during that time.
 596 (nuclear test): The People's Republic of China explodes an atomic bomb in Sinkiang.
 October 22
 Canada: A Federal Multi-Party Parliamentary Committee selects a design to become the new official Flag of Canada.
 A 5.3 kiloton nuclear device is detonated at the Tatum Salt Dome,  from Hattiesburg, Mississippi, as part of the Vela Uniform program. This test is the Salmon phase of the Atomic Energy Commission's Project Dribble.
 October 24 – Northern Rhodesia, a former British protectorate, becomes the independent Republic of Zambia, ending 73 years of British rule.
 October 26 – Eric Edgar Cooke becomes the last man executed in Western Australia, for murdering 8 citizens in Perth between 1959 and 1963.
 October 27 – In the Democratic Republic of the Congo, rebel leader Christopher Gbenye takes 60 Americans and 800 Belgians hostage.
 October 29 – A collection of irreplaceable gemstones, including the  Star of India, is stolen from the American Museum of Natural History in New York City.

November

 November 1 – Mortar fire from North Vietnamese forces rains on the Bien Hoa Air Base, killing four U.S. servicemen, wounding 72, and destroying five B-57 jet bombers and other planes.
 November 3
 1964 United States presidential election: Incumbent President Lyndon B. Johnson defeats Republican challenger Barry Goldwater with over 60 percent of the popular vote.
 The Bolivian government of President Víctor Paz Estenssoro is overthrown by a military rebellion led by General Alfredo Ovando Candía, commander-in-chief of the armed forces.
 November 5 – Mariner program: Mariner 3 spacecraft is launched from Cape Kennedy but fails.
 November 10 – Australia partially reintroduces compulsory military service due to the Indonesian Confrontation.
 November 19 – The United States Department of Defense announces the closing of 95 military bases and facilities, including Fort Jay, the Brooklyn Navy Yard and the Brooklyn Army Terminal.
 November 21
 Second Vatican Council: The third period of the Catholic Church's ecumenical council closes. Lumen gentium, the Dogmatic Constitution on the Church, is promulgated.
 The Verrazano-Narrows Bridge across New York Bay opens to traffic (the world's longest suspension bridge at this time).
 November 24 – Belgian paratroopers and mercenaries capture Stanleyville, but a number of hostages die in the fighting, among them American Evangelical Covenant Church missionary Dr. Paul Carlson.
 November 28
 Mariner program: NASA launches the Mariner 4 space probe from Cape Kennedy toward Mars to take television pictures of that planet in July 1965.
 Vietnam War: United States National Security Council members, including Robert McNamara, Dean Rusk, and Maxwell Taylor, agree to recommend a plan for a 2-stage escalation of bombing in North Vietnam, to President Lyndon B. Johnson.
 France performs an underground nuclear test at Ecker, Algeria.

December

 December 1 – Gustavo Díaz Ordaz takes office as President of Mexico.
 December 3
 Berkeley Free Speech Movement: Police arrest about 800 students at the University of California, Berkeley, following their takeover of and massive sit-in at the Sproul Hall administration building. The sit-in most directly protested the U.C. Regents' decision to punish student activists for what many thought had been justified civil disobedience earlier in the conflict.
 The Danish football club Brøndby IF is founded as a merger between the two local clubs Brøndbyøster Idrætsforening and Brøndbyvester Idrætsforening. The club wins the national championship Danish Superliga 10 times, and the Danish Cups six times, after joining the Danish top-flight football league in 1981.
 December 5 – Australian Senate election, 1964: The Liberal/Country Coalition Government led by Prime Minister Robert Menzies hold their status quo, while the Labor Party led by Arthur Calwell lose one seat to the Democratic Labor Party, who hold the balance of power in the Senate alongside independent Reg Turnbull.
 December 10 – Dr. Martin Luther King Jr. is awarded the Nobel Peace Prize in Oslo, Norway.
 December 11 – Che Guevara addresses the United Nations General Assembly. A bazooka attack is launched at the Headquarters of the United Nations in New York City.
 December 12 – Jamhuri Day: Kenya becomes a republic, with Jomo Kenyatta as its first President.
 December 14 – Heart of Atlanta Motel v. United States (379 US 241 1964): The U.S. Supreme Court rules that, in accordance with the Civil Rights Act of 1964, establishments providing public accommodation must refrain from racial discrimination.
 December 18 – The Christmas flood of 1964 begins in the United States, affecting the Pacific Northwest and some of Northern California. It will continue until January 7, resulting in 19 deaths, serious damage to buildings, roads and bridges, and the loss of 4,000 head of livestock.
 December 21 – The General Dynamics F-111 Aardvark supersonic attack aircraft, developed for the U.S. Air Force, makes its first flight, at Carswell Air Force Base, Texas.
 December 22
 A cyclone in the Palk Strait destroys the Indian town of Dhanushkodi, killing 1800 people.
 The Lockheed SR-71 Blackbird makes its first flight at Palmdale, California.
 December 23 – Wonderful Radio London becomes the United Kingdom's fourth "Pirate" radio station, broadcasting from MV Galaxy (a former US Navy minesweeper) anchored off the east coast of England, with an American-style Top 40 ("Fab 40") playlist of popular records.
 December 24 – The Brinks Hotel in Saigon, Vietnam, is bombed by the Viet Cong, resulting in the deaths of two US soldiers and injuries to a further 60 people, including civilians.
 December 30 – The United Nations Conference on Trade and Development (UNCTAD) is established as a permanent organ of the UN General Assembly.

Date unknown
 Spring – First recognition of cosmic microwave background radiation as a detectable phenomenon.
 Jerome Horwitz synthesizes zidovudine (AZT), an antiviral drug which will later be used in treating HIV.
 Farrington Daniels becomes an early advocate of solar energy in his book Direct Use of the Sun's Energy, published by Yale University Press in the United States.
 Rudi Gernreich designs the original monokini topless swimsuit in the U.S.
 The Vishva Hindu Pariṣad is founded in India.

Births

January

 January 1 – Moussa Dadis Camara, Guinean general and 3rd President of Guinea
 January 2 – Pernell Whitaker, American boxer (died 2019)
 January 4
 Susan Devoy, New Zealand squash player
 Alexandre Fadeev, Soviet figure skater
 Dot-Marie Jones, American actress and retired athlete (competed as Dot Jones)
 January 5 – Miguel Ángel Jiménez, Spanish golfer
 January 6
 Henry Maske, German boxer
 Anthony Scaramucci, American financier, entrepreneur, and political figure
 January 7 – Nicolas Cage, American actor
 January 12 – Jeff Bezos, American Internet entrepreneur
 January 13 – Penelope Ann Miller, American actress
 January 17 – Michelle Obama, American attorney and author, former First Lady of the United States
 January 20
 Koko Pimentel, Filipino politician, 28th President of the Senate of the Philippines
 January 23 – Mariska Hargitay, American actress
 January 27 – Bridget Fonda, American actress
 January 31 – Jeff Hanneman, American rock guitarist (Slayer) (died 2013)

February

 February 1 – Eli Ohana, Israeli football player and club chairman
 February 5
 Laura Linney, American actress
 Duff McKagan, American rock musician and songwriter
 February 10 – Francesca Neri, Italian actress
 February 11 – Ken Shamrock, American mixed martial arts fighter
 February 15 − Chris Farley, American actor and comedian (died 1997)
 February 16
 Bebeto, Brazilian footballer
 Christopher Eccleston, British actor
 Valentina Yegorova, Russian distance runner
 February 18 − Matt Dillon, American actor and film director
 February 19 − Jennifer Doudna, American biochemist
 February 20 − Rudi Garcia, French football manager
 February 22 − Gigi Fernández, American tennis player
 February 28 – Djamolidine Abdoujaparov, Uzbekistan cyclist

March

 March 7
 Bret Easton Ellis, American author
 Vladimir Smirnov, Kazakh cross-country skier
 Wanda Sykes, African-American comedian and actress
 March 9 – Juliette Binoche, French actress
 March 10
 Edith Lucie Bongo, First Lady of Gabon (died 2009)
 Neneh Cherry, Swedish-born singer-songwriter
 Prince Edward, Duke of Edinburgh, British prince and third son (youngest child) of Elizabeth II and Prince Philip, Duke of Edinburgh
 March 16
 Pascal Richard, Swiss road bicycle racer
 Gore Verbinski, American film director
 March 17 – Rob Lowe, American actor
 March 18
 Bonnie Blair, American speed skater
 March 24 – Liz McColgan, British long-distance runner athlete
 March 26 – Maria Miller, British politician
 March 29 – Elle Macpherson, Australian model and actress
 March 30
 Vera Zimmermann, Brazilian actress
 Tracy Chapman, African-American singer
 Ian Ziering, American actor

April

 April 1 – Erik Breukink, Dutch cyclist and manager
 April 3
 Nigel Farage, British politician
 Bjarne Riis, Danish cyclist
 Yelena Ruzina, Russian Olympic athlete
 April 4 – David Cross, American actor and comedian
 April 6 – David Woodard, American businessman
 April 7 – Russell Crowe, New Zealand-born actor
 April 10 – Hiroshi Tsuburaya, Japanese actor (died 2001)
 April 14 – Jim Grabb, American tennis player
 April 16 – Esbjörn Svensson Swedish jazz pianist (d. 2008)
 April 17
Maynard James Keenan, American rock musician (Tool)
 Rachel Notley, Canadian politician, Premier of Alberta 2015–2019
 April 18 – Bonnie Blair, American speed skater
 April 20
John Carney, American football player
 Crispin Glover, American actor
 Andy Serkis, English actor
 April 21
 Ludmila Engquist, Russian-born Swedish hurdler
 Ahmed Radhi, Iraqi footballer (d. 2020)
 April 24 – Djimon Hounsou, Beninese actor and model
 April 25 – Hank Azaria, American actor, voice artist and comedian
 April 28 – L'Wren Scott, American fashion designer (d. 2014)
 April 29 – Federico Castelluccio, Italian-born actor
 April 30 
 Abhishek Chatterjee, Indian actor
 Tony Fernandes, Malaysian entrepreneur and businessman

May

 May 1 – Yvonne van Gennip, Dutch speed-skater
 May 5
 Heike Henkel, German Olympic athlete
 Minami Takayama, Japanese voice actress and singer (Two-Mix and DoCo)
 May 8 – Melissa Gilbert, American actress and president of the Screen Actors Guild
 May 10 – Emmanuelle Devos, French actress
 May 13 – Stephen Colbert, American comedian, political commentator, and television personality; host of The Late Show with Stephen Colbert
 May 19 – Samuel Okwaraji, Nigerian footballer (died 1989)
 May 20 – Charles Spencer, 9th Earl Spencer, British aristocrat, author, print journalist and broadcaster. Younger brother of Diana, Princess of Wales.
 May 21 – Rui Maria de Araújo, East Timorese politician
 May 23 – Ruth Metzler-Arnold, member of the Swiss Federal Council
 May 24 – Adrian Moorhouse, British swimmer
 May 25 – Ray Stevenson, Northern Irish-born actor
 May 26 – Lenny Kravitz, American singer, songwriter, and actor
 May 28 – Jeff Fenech, Australian boxer
 May 29 – Arumugam Thondaman, Sri Lankan politician (died 2020)
 May 30 – Tom Morello, American musician and political activist (Rage Against the Machine, Audioslave, Prophets of Rage)

June

 June 3 – James Purefoy, British actor
 June 7 – Gia Carides, Greek-Australian actress
 June 9 – Gloria Reuben, Canadian-American actress
June 10
 Ben Daniels, English actor
 Vincent Perez, Swiss actor, director and photographer 
 June 13
 Kathy Burke, English actress and comedian
 Šarūnas Marčiulionis, Lithuanian basketball player
 June 15
 Courteney Cox, American actress
 Michael Laudrup, Danish footballer and manager
 June 17 – Michael Gross, German swimmer
 June 18 – Uday Hussein, Iraqi Army commander (d. 2003)
 June 19 – Boris Johnson, Prime Minister of the United Kingdom 2019-2022
 June 20 – Ethella Chupryk, Ukrainian pianist (d. 2019)
 June 21 
 Dean Saunders, Welsh football manager and former professional footballer
 Kiyoshi Okuma, Japanese football player and manager
 June 22
 Dan Brown, American author
 Miroslav Kadlec, Czech football defender
 Nico Jalink, Dutch footballer and football manager
 June 23
 Astrid Carolina Herrera, Venezuelan actress 
 Joss Whedon, American screenwriter
 June 24 – Günther Mader, Austrian alpine ski racer
 June 25 – Johnny Herbert, English racing driver
 June 26 – Tommi Mäkinen, Finnish rally driver
 June 30 – Alexandra, Countess of Frederiksborg, Danish aristocrat

July

 July 1 
 Yu Long, Chinese conductor
 Bernard Laporte, French rugby player and coach
 Loli Sánchez, Spanish basketball player
 Chie Satō, Japanese voice actress
 July 2 – Jose and Ozzie Canseco, Cuban-born American baseball players; twin brothers
 July 3
 Joanne Harris, English novelist
 Aleksei Serebryakov, Russian-Canadian actor
 Yeardley Smith, American actress, voice actress, comedian, writer and artist
 July 4 – Edi Rama, 33rd Prime Minister of Albania
 July 5 – Stephen H. Scott, Canadian neuroscientist and engineer
 July 6 – Kim Jee-woon, South Korean film director and screenwriter
 July 9
 Courtney Love, American musician/actress
 Gianluca Vialli, Italian footballer and manager (d. 2023)
 July 11 – Goran Radaković, Serbian actor
 July 13 – Pascal Hervé, French road racing cyclist
 July 15 
 Tetsuji Hashiratani, Japanese football player and manager
 Tengku Zulpuri Shah Raja Puji, Malaysian politician
 July 16 – Miguel Indurain, Spanish cyclist
 July 18 – Wendy Williams, African-American talk show host
 July 19
 Teresa Edwards, American basketball player
 Miyeegombyn Enkhbold, Mongolian politician
 July 20 
 Chris Cornell, American singer (Soundgarden, Audioslave, Temple of the Dog) (died 2017)
 Deon Lotz, South African actor
 July 24
 Barry Bonds, African-American baseball player
 Pedro Passos Coelho, 118th Prime Minister of Portugal 
 July 26
 Sandra Bullock, American actress and film producer
 Ancelma Perlacios, Bolivian politician and trade unionist
 Anne Provoost, Belgian author
 July 28 – Lori Loughlin, American actress
 July 30
 Vivica A. Fox, American actress
 Jürgen Klinsmann, German football player and manager
 July 31 – C.C. Catch, Dutch-born German singer

August

 August 1 – Natalya Shikolenko, Belarusian javelin thrower
 August 2 – Mary-Louise Parker, American actress
 August 3
 Lucky Dube, South African reggae musician (died 2007)
 Abhisit Vejjajiva, 27th Prime Minister of Thailand
 August 8 – Giuseppe Conte, Italian Prime Minister
 August 15 – Melinda Gates, American philanthropist
 August 22 – Mats Wilander, Swedish tennis player
 August 24 – Salizhan Sharipov, Russian cosmonaut and astronaut
 August 25
 Maxim Kontsevich, Russian mathematician
 Azmin Ali, Malaysian politician
 August 26 – Torsten Schmitz, German boxer

September

 September 2 – Keanu Reeves, Canadian actor 
 September 6 – Rosie Perez, American actress and comedian
 September 7 
 María Fernanda Espinosa, Ecuadorian politician and diplomat
 Eazy-E, American rapper and record producer (d. 1995)
 Andy Hug, Swiss Seidokaikan karateka and kickboxer (died 2000)
 September 10
 Jack Ma, Chinese business magnate and billionaire internet entrepreneur
 Yegor Letov, Russian singer (died 2008)
 September 13 – Simegnew Bekele, Ethiopian engineer and public administrator (died 2018)
 September 15 – Robert Fico, Prime Minister of Slovakia
 September 16 – Molly Shannon, American actress
 September 19
 Yvonne Vera, Zimbabwean actress (died 2005)
 Trisha Yearwood, American country singer
 September 20 – Maggie Cheung, Hong Kong actress
 September 21 – Jorge Drexler, Uruguayan musician
 September 23
 Josefa Idem, German-born Italian kayaker
 Koshi Inaba, Japanese singer (B'z)
 September 25
Marc Benioff, American Internet entrepreneur and philanthropist
 Kikuko Inoue, Japanese singer and voice actress
 Carlos Ruiz Zafón, Spanish novelist (died 2020)
September 27 – Stephan Jenkins, American singer and rock musician (Third Eye Blind)
 September 28 – Janeane Garofalo, American actress and comedian
 September 30 – Monica Bellucci, Italian actress and model

October

 October 2 – Makharbek Khadartsev, Russian free-style wrestler
 October 3 – Clive Owen, English actor
 October 4 – Yvonne Murray, Scottish athlete
 October 6 – Tom Jager, American swimmer
 October 9 
 Guillermo del Toro, Mexican film director
 Martín Jaite, Argentine tennis player
 October 10 – Maxi Gnauck, German gymnast
 October 22
 Dražen Petrović, Croatian basketball player (died 1993)
 Paul McStay, Scottish footballer
 October 24 – Rosana Arbelo, Spanish singer and composer
 October 25
 Nicole Seibert, German singer, Eurovision Song Contest 1982 winner
 Andreas Münzer, Austrian bodybuilder (died 1996)
 October 26 – Elisabeta Lipă, Romanian rower
 October 27 – Mary T. Meagher, American swimmer
 October 30 – Tabitha St. Germain, Canadian voice actress and singer
 October 31 – Marco van Basten, Dutch footballer and manager

November

 November 3 – Paprika Steen, Danish actress
 November 10 – Magnús Scheving, Icelandic producer
 November 11 – Calista Flockhart, American actress
 November 12 
 David Ellefson, American rock bassist (Megadeth)
 Jakob Hlasek, Swiss tennis player
 Michael Kremer, American development economist, recipient of the Nobel Memorial Prize in Economic Sciences
 Barbara Stühlmeyer, German musicologist, church musician and writer 
 November 13 – Tzufit Grant, Israeli actress
 November 16 
 Diana Krall, Canadian jazz pianist and singer
 Valeria Bruni Tedeschi, Italian-French actress
 November 19 – Phil Hughes, Irish footballer and coach
 November 20 – Doug Ford, 26th Premier of Ontario
 November 22 – Apetor, Norwegian YouTuber (d. 2021)
 November 23 – Erika Buenfil, Mexican actress and singer
 November 24 – Conleth Hill, Irish actor
 November 26 – Vreni Schneider, Swiss alpine skier
 November 27 – Ronit Elkabetz, Israeli actress, writer and filmmaker (died 2016)
 November 28
 Giorgi Bagaturov, Georgian-Armenian chess grandmaster
 Oscar Muñoz, Colombian wrestler
 November 29 – Don Cheadle, African-American actor

December

 December 1 – Salvatore Schillaci, Italian footballer
 December 4
 Sertab Erener, Turkish singer-songwriter, Eurovision Song Contest 2003 winner
 Marisa Tomei, American actress
 December 7 – Hugo Blick, British filmmaker and actor 
 December 8 – Teri Hatcher, American actress, writer, presenter and singer
 December 9 – Paul Landers, German rock musician (Rammstein)
 December 10 – Edith González, Mexican actress (died 2019)
 December 13 – Hide, Japanese musician (died 1998)
 December 16 – Heike Drechsler, German track-and-field athlete
 December 18
 Stone Cold Steve Austin, American professional wrestler and actor
 Pierre Nkurunziza, 8th President of Burundi (died 2020)
 December 19 – Arvydas Sabonis, Lithuanian basketball player
 December 23 – Eddie Vedder, American rock singer (Pearl Jam)

Deaths

January

 January 4 – Andreas Hermes, German agricultural scientist and politician (born 1878)
 January 8 – Julius Raab, Austrian politician, 14th Chancellor of Austria (born 1891)
 January 9 – Halide Edib Adıvar, Turkish novelist (born 1884)
 January 11 – Bechara El Khoury, 2nd Prime Minister of Lebanon and 6th President of Lebanon (born 1890)
 January 15
 Tawfiq Canaan, Palestinian doctor (born 1882)
 Jack Teagarden, American jazz trombonist (born 1905)
 January 19 – Joe Weatherly, NASCAR championship driver (born 1922)
 January 21 
 Joseph Baumgartner, German politician (born 1904)
 Joseph Schildkraut, Austrian actor (born 1896)
 January 22 
 Lissy Arna, German actress (born 1900)
 Marc Blitzstein, American composer (born 1905)
 January 23
 Benedetta Bianchi Porro, Italian Roman Catholic laywoman and venerable (born 1936)
 Lucila Gamero de Medina, Honduranian novelist (born 1873)
 January 27 – Waite Phillips, American businessman, philanthropist (born 1883)
 January 29
 Adolfo Diaz Recinos, 2-time President of Nicaragua (born 1875)
 Alan Ladd, American actor (born 1913)
 January 31 
 Louis Allen, American civil rights activist and businessman (born 1919)
 Kanysh Satbayev, Kazakh academician and geologist (born 1899)

February

 February 3
 Infante Alfonso, Duke of Calabria (born 1901)
 Giuseppe Amato, Italian producer, director and screenwriter (born 1899)
 February 5 – Matilde Moisant, American pilot (born 1878)
 February 6 – Emilio Aguinaldo, Filipino general and 1st President of the Philippines (born 1869)
 February 7 – Sofoklis Venizelos, Greek politician, three-time Prime Minister of Greece (born 1894)
 February 8 – Ernst Kretschmer, German psychiatrist (born 1888)
 February 10 – Eugen Sänger, Austrian aerospace engineer (born 1905)
 February 12 – Gerald Gardner, English polymath, founder of Wiccan religion (born 1884)
 February 13 – Paulino Alcántara, Filipino-Spanish footballer (born 1896)
 February 15
Reginald Garrigou-Lagrange, French theologian (born 1877)
 Robert L. Thornton, American businessman, philanthropist and mayor of Dallas, Texas (born 1880)
 February 18 – Joseph-Armand Bombardier, Canadian inventor of the snowmobile and founder of Bombardier Inc. (born 1907)
 February 25
 Alexander Archipenko, Ukrainian-American sculptor (born 1887)
 Johnny Burke, American lyricist (born 1908)
 Mariano Jesús Cuenco, Filipino politician and writer (born 1888)
 Grace Metalious, American writer (born 1924)
 February 27 – Orry-Kelly, Australian-born costume designer (born 1897)

March

 March 6
 Paul of Greece, King of Greece (born 1901)
 Edward Van Sloan, American actor (born 1882)
 March 9 – Paul von Lettow-Vorbeck, German general (born 1870)
 March 12 – Abbās al-Aqqād, Egyptian journalist (born 1889)
 March 18
 Sigfrid Edström, Swedish industrialist, 4th President of the International Olympic Committee (born 1870)
 Norbert Wiener, American mathematician (born 1894)
 March 19 – Leo Maximilian Baginski, German entrepreneur (born 1891)
 March 20 – Brendan Behan, Irish poet and writer (born 1923)
 March 23 – Peter Lorre, Hungarian-born actor (born 1904) 
 March 25 – Alfredo Bigatti, Argentine sculptor (born 1898)
 March 30 – Birinchi Kumar Barua, Indian folklorist (born 1890)

April

 April 1 – Božidar Kunc, Yugoslav composer (born 1903)
 April 3 – Franz Joseph, Prince of Hohenzollern-Emden (born 1891)
 April 4 – Georgia Caine, American actress (born 1876)
 April 5 – Douglas MacArthur, U.S. Army general, Supreme Allied Commander in Japan after World War II (born 1880)
 April 6 – Jigme Palden Dorji, 1st Prime Minister of Bhutan (born 1919; assassinated)
 April 7 – Bruce W. Klunder, American Presbyterian minister and civil rights activist (born 1937)
 April 13 – Veit Harlan, German film director (born 1899)
 April 14 
 Tatyana Afanasyeva, Soviet mathematician and physicist (born 1876)
 Rachel Carson, American biologist and environmental writer (born 1907)
 April 18 
 Fumio Asakura, Japanese sculptor (born 1883)
 Ben Hecht, American screenwriter (born 1894)
 April 20 
 Dimitar Ganev, Bulgarian communist politician, head of the State (born 1890)
 August Sander, German photographer (born 1876)
 April 24 – Gerhard Domagk, German bacteriologist, recipient of the Nobel Prize in Physiology or Medicine (declined) (born 1895)
 April 26 – E. J. Pratt, Canadian poet (born 1882)
 April 29 – Wenceslao Fernández Flórez, Spanish journalist and novelist (born 1885)

May

 May 2 – Nancy Astor, Viscountess Astor, American-born British politician (born 1879)
 May 5 – Tadao Ikeda, Japanese director and screenwriter (born 1905)
 May 6 – José Maza Fernández, Chilean politician, lawyer and diplomat (born 1889)
 May 8 – Kichisaburō Nomura, Japanese admiral and diplomat (born 1877)
 May 10 – Carol Haney, American dancer and actress (born 1924)
 May 13 – Diana Wynyard, English actress (born 1906)
 May 17 – Steve Owen, American football coach (New York Giants) and a member of the Pro Football Hall of Fame (born 1898)
 May 20 – Rudy Lewis, American rhythm and blues singer (born 1936)
 May 21 – James Franck, German-born physicist, Nobel Prize laureate (born 1882)
 May 26 – Ruben Oskar Auervaara, Finnish fraudster (born 1906)
 May 27 – Jawaharlal Nehru, Indian politician, 1st Prime Minister of India (born 1889)
 May 30
 Dave MacDonald, American sports car driver (born 1936)
 Eddie Sachs, American auto racing driver (born 1927)
 Leó Szilárd, Hungarian-born American physicist (born 1898)

June

 June 3 
 Raoul Magrin-Vernerey, French army officer (born 1892)
 Frans Eemil Sillanpää, Finnish writer, Nobel Prize laureate (born 1888)
 June 6 
 Prince Hermann of Saxe-Weimar-Eisenach (born 1886)
 Robert Warwick, American actor (born 1878)
 June 7
 Violet Attlee, Countess Attlee, wife of former British PM Clement Attlee (born 1895)
 Charlie Llewellyn, first non-white South African Test cricketer (born 1876)
 June 8 – Carlos Quintanilla , 37th President of Bolivia (born 1888)
 June 9 – Max Aitken, 1st Baron Beaverbrook, Canadian-born British newspaper publisher and politician (born 1879)
 June 11
 Catharine Carter Critcher, American painter (born 1868)
 John Eke, Swedish Olympic athlete (born 1886)
 Plaek Phibunsongkhram, Thai field marshal and 3rd Prime Minister of Thailand (born 1897)
 June 18 – Giorgio Morandi, Italian painter (born 1890)
 June 24 – Stuart Davis, American painter (born 1892)
 June 25 – Gerrit Rietveld, Dutch architect (born 1888)
 June 27 
 Salvatore Aldisio, Italian politician (born 1890)
 Mona Barrie, English actress (born 1909)
 June 29 – Eric Dolphy, American saxophonist (born 1928)

July

 July 1 – Pierre Monteux, French conductor (born 1875)
 July 2 – Fireball Roberts, American race car driver and a member of the NASCAR Hall of Fame (born 1929)
 July 6 – Zeng Junchen, Sichuan's 'King of Opium' (born 1888)
 July 7 – Lillian Copeland, American athlete (born 1904)
 July 11 – Maurice Thorez, leader of the French Communist Party (born 1900)
 July 13 – Stephen Galatti, Director of AFS, American Field Service (born 1888)
 July 14 – Prince Axel of Denmark (born 1888)
 July 15 – Luis Batlle Berres, Uruguayan political figure, 30th President of Uruguay (born 1897)
 July 16 – Alfred Junge, German-born art director (born 1886)
 July 21 – Jean Fautrier, French painter and sculptor (born 1898)
 July 22 
 Leonid Baratov, Soviet director (born 1895)
 Gildo Bocci, Italian actor (born 1886)
 July 23 – Thakin Kodaw Hmaing, Burmese poet and politician (born 1876)
 July 25 – Sir John Latham, Australian judge and politician (born 1877)
 July 26 – William A. Seiter, American film director (born 1890)
 July 31 – Jim Reeves, American country singer (born 1923)

August

 August 3 – Flannery O'Connor, American writer (born 1925)
 August 6 – Sir Cedric Hardwicke, English actor (born 1893)
 August 7 
 Salima Machamba, Sultan of Mohéli (born 1874)
 Aleksander Zawadzki, Polish politician, 12th President of Poland (born 1899)
 August 9 – Fontaine Fox, American cartoonist (born 1884)
 August 11 – André Aymard, French historian (born 1900)
 August 12
 Isidro Fabela, Mexican judge and politician (born 1882)
 Ian Fleming, British writer (born 1908)
 Dmitry Dmitrievich Maksutov, Soviet astronomer and inventor (born 1896)
 August 13 – Mushtaq Hussain Khan, Indian musician (born 1878)
 August 14 – Johnny Burnette, American singer (born 1934)
 August 18 – Mohammad Gul Khan Momand, Afghani politician (born 1885)
 August 20 – Anthony de Francisci, Italian-born American sculptor (born 1887)
 August 21 – Palmiro Togliatti, leader of the Italian Communist Party (born 1893)
 August 22 – Symeon Lukach, Soviet Eastern Catholic bishop, martyr and blessed (born 1893)
 August 23 – Estella Canziani, British painter (born 1887)
 August 27 – Gracie Allen, American actress and comedian, known as part of the comedy duo Burns and Allen (born 1895)
 August 28 – Lumsden Hare, Irish-born actor, theatre director, and theatre producer
 August 30 – Aleksei Aleksandrovich Grechkin, Soviet commander (born 1893)
 August 31 – Peter Lanyon, British painter (born 1918)

September

 September 2
 Glenn Albert Black, American archaeologist (born 1900)
 Francisco Craveiro Lopes, Portuguese military officer and politician, 12th President of Portugal (born 1894)
 Alvin Cullum York, American hero of World War I (born 1887)
 September 9 
 Sir George Abercromby, 8th Baronet, British baronet (born 1886)
 Herschel Bennett, American baseball player of St. Louis Browns (born 1896)
 September 15 – Herbert Heywood, American actor (born 1881)
 September 17 – Clive Bell, English art critic (born 1881)
 September 18 – Seán O'Casey, Irish writer (born 1880)
 September 21 – Otto Grotewohl, East German Communist politician, 1st Prime Minister of the German Democratic Republic (born 1894)
 September 23 – Fred M. Wilcox, American film director (born 1907)
 September 28
 Nacio Herb Brown, American songwriter (born 1896)
 Harpo Marx, American comedian, actor, mime artist, and musician (born 1888)
 September 29 – Fred Tootell, American Olympic athlete (born 1902)

October

 October 1 – Ernst Toch, Austrian composer (born 1887)
 October 10 – Eddie Cantor, American actor, comedian and dancer (born 1892)
 October 15 – Cole Porter, American composer and lyricist (born 1891)
 October 19 – Russ Brown, American actor (born 1892)
 October 20 – Herbert Hoover, American politician, 31st President of the United States (born 1874)
 October 21 – Margaret Gibson, American actress (born 1894)
 October 22
 Khawaja Nazimuddin, Pakistani political figure, 2nd Prime Minister of Pakistan (born 1894)
 Whip Wilson, American actor (born 1911)
 October 25 – Joe Henderson, American rhythm and blues and gospel music singer (born 1937)
 October 26 – Eric Edgar Cooke, Australian serial killer (born 1931)
 October 27
 Pierre Cartier, French jeweller (born 1878)
 Rudolph Maté, Polish cinematographer (born 1898)
 October 29
 Claudio Ermelli, Italian actor (born 1892)
 Henry Larsen, Canadian explorer (born 1899)
 October 31 – Theodore Freeman, American astronaut (born 1930)

November

 November 2 
 Charles Walter Allfrey, British general (born 1895)
 José Ramón Guizado, Panamanian politician, 17th President of Panama (born 1899)
 November 5
 Mabel Lucie Attwell, British illustrator (born 1879)
 John S. Robertson, Canadian film director (born 1878)
 November 6 – Hans von Euler-Chelpin, German-born chemist, Nobel Prize laureate (born 1873)
 November 10 
 Jimmie Dodd, American actor and television personality (born 1910)
 Sam Newfield, American movie director (born 1899)
 November 11 
 Franciszek Barda, Polish Roman Catholic clergyman and servant of God (born 1880)
 Juan de Dios Filiberto, Argentine violinist (born 1885)
 Eduard Steuermann, Austrian-American pianist and composer (born 1892)
 November 12 – Rickard Sandler, Swedish politician, 20th Prime Minister of Sweden (born 1884)
 November 13 – Oskar Becker, German philosopher (born 1889)
 November 14 – Heinrich von Brentano, German politician (born 1904)
 November 18 – Tommaso Besozzi, Italian journalist (born 1903)
November 21 – Catherine Bauer Wurster, American architect and public housing advocate (born 1905)
 November 24 –  William O'Dwyer, American diplomat and politician, 100th Mayor of New York City (born 1890)
 November 25 – Clarence Kolb, American actor (born 1874)
 November 28 – Charles Meredith, American actor (born 1894)
 November 29 – Anne de Vries, Dutch writer (born 1904)

December

 December 1
 Marie-Clémentine Anuarite Nengapeta, Congolese Roman Catholic religious sister (born 1939)
 J. B. S. Haldane, British geneticist (born 1892)
 December 2 – Pina Pellicer, Mexican actress (born 1934)
 December 5 – V. Veerasingam, Ceylon Tamil teacher and politician (born 1892)
 December 6 – Consuelo Vanderbilt, Duchess of Marlborough (born 1877)
 December 9 – Dame Edith Sitwell, British poet (born 1887)
 December 10 – Mariano Rossell y Arellano, Guatemalan clergyman (born 1894)
 December 11
 Sam Cooke, American singer and songwriter (born 1931)
 Alma Schindler Mahler, wife of Gustav Mahler (born 1879)
 December 13 – Ernesto Almirante, Italian actor (born 1877)
 December 14
 William Bendix, American actor (born 1906)
 Francisco Canaro, Uruguayan-born composer (born 1888)
 December 15 – C. J. Hambro, Norwegian politician and journalist (born 1885)
 December 17 – Victor Francis Hess, Austrian-born American physicist, Nobel Prize laureate (born 1883)
 December 21 – Carl Van Vechten, American writer and photographer (born 1880)
 December 22 – Rosa Borja de Ycaza, Ecuadorian writer (born 1889)
 December 24 – Kuksha of Odessa, Eastern Orthodox priest (born 1875)
 December 29 – Vladimir Favorsky, Russian artist and engraver (born 1886)
 December 30 – Hans Gerhard Creutzfeldt, German neuropathologist (born 1885)
 December 31
 Ólafur Thors, Icelandic politician, 8th Prime Minister of Iceland (born 1892)
 Henry Maitland Wilson, British field marshal (born 1881)

Nobel Prizes

 Physics – Charles Hard Townes, Nicolay Gennadiyevich Basov, Aleksandr Prokhorov
 Chemistry – Dorothy Crowfoot Hodgkin
 Physiology or Medicine – Konrad Bloch, Feodor Lynen
 Literature – Jean-Paul Sartre
 Peace – Martin Luther King Jr.

References

External links 

 
Leap years in the Gregorian calendar